The Royal Standards of the United Kingdom refers to either one of two similar flags used by King Charles III in his capacity as Sovereign of the United Kingdom, the Crown dependencies, and the British Overseas Territories. Two versions of the flag exist, one for general use in Scotland and the other for use elsewhere.

Although almost universally called a standard, such flags when used in the United Kingdom are banners of arms, as they comprise the shield of the Royal Arms. From the 1960s until her death in 2022, Queen Elizabeth II had several personal flags designed for her use as sovereign of certain Commonwealth realms. These heraldic flags are similar to those of the British "Royal Standard" in being banners of the nation's arms but feature a device found in the Queen's general personal flag (a blue disc containing a wreath of gold roses encircling a crowned letter 'E').

The Royal Standard of the United Kingdom is flown when the Monarch is in residence in one of the royal palaces and on his car, ship, or aeroplane.  It may be flown on any building, official or private, during a visit by the Monarch, if the owner or proprietor so requests. It famously replaces the Union Flag over the Palace of Westminster when the Monarch visits during the State Opening of Parliament. The Royal Standard was flown aboard the royal yacht when it was in service and Queen Elizabeth II was on board. The only church that may fly a Royal Standard, even without the presence of the Sovereign, is Westminster Abbey, a Royal Peculiar.

When the Queen visited the United States in 1991, she was provided with a Cadillac limousine that flew both her standard and the Stars and Stripes, an acknowledgement of the "special relationship" that exists between the two nations.

The Royal Standard is flown at royal residences only when the sovereign is present. If the Union Flag flies above Buckingham Palace, Windsor Castle or Sandringham House, it signals that the King is not in residence. In 1934, King George V permitted his subjects in Scotland to display the ancient Royal Standard of Scotland as part of his silver jubilee.  Today, it flies above Holyrood Palace and Balmoral Castle when the Monarch is not in residence.

When the Monarch attends Parliament at the Palace of Westminster, the Royal Standard flies from Victoria Tower.

Unlike the Union Flag, the Royal Standard should never be flown at half-mast, even after the demise of the Crown, as there is always a sovereign on the throne. It flew at half-mast for several hours from the death of Edward VII until George V discovered the error.

Controversy arose regarding the lack of a flag at half-mast over Buckingham Palace following the death of Diana, Princess of Wales, in 1997. The Queen was then in summer residence at Balmoral; and according to established custom, no flag was displayed over Buckingham Palace, as the monarch was not present. The Queen proposed a compromise whereby the Union Flag would be flown at half-mast on the day of Diana's funeral.   The Union Flag was also flown at half-mast over Buckingham Palace as a mark of respect on the first anniversary of the death of Diana, Princess of Wales, on Bank Holiday, Monday, 31 August 1998. Since then, the Union Flag has flown regularly in the monarch's absence and has been lowered to half-mast to mark several occasions such as the death of Queen Elizabeth The Queen Mother, the September 11 attacks, the 7 July 2005 London bombings and the death of Elizabeth II.

England, Northern Ireland, Wales, the Crown dependencies and the British Overseas Territories 

In England, Northern Ireland, Wales, the Crown dependencies and the British Overseas Territories, the flag is divided into four quadrants. The first and fourth quadrants represent the ancient Kingdom of England and contain three gold lions (or "leopards"), passant guardant on a red field; the second quadrant represents the ancient Kingdom of Scotland and contains a red lion rampant on a gold field; the third quadrant represents the ancient Kingdom of Ireland and contains a version of the gold harp from the coat of arms of Ireland on a blue field. The inclusion of the harp remains an issue for some in Ireland. In 1937 Éamon de Valera, then Taoiseach, asked Dominions Secretary Malcolm MacDonald if the harp quarter could be removed from the Royal Standard on the grounds that the Irish people had not given their consent to the Irish emblem being included. The request was denied and the harp remains.

The modern Royal Standard of the United Kingdom, apart from minor changes (notably to the form of harp used to represent Ireland), dates to the reign of Queen Victoria. Earlier Royal Standards of the United Kingdom incorporated the Arms of Hanover and of the Kingdom of France, representing the title of Elector (later King) of Hanover and the theoretical claim to the throne of France, a claim dropped in 1800).  The Hanoverian association terminated in 1837 with the accession of Queen Victoria who, being a female, could not accede to Hanover.

Famous Royal Standards of former British Monarchs include the Scotland Impaled Royal Standard of Queen Anne, the Hanover Quartered Royal Standards of King George I to George III, and the Hanover crowned Royal Standards of George III to William IV. The latter contained the Royal coat of arms of Hanover superimposed over what became the modern Royal Standard of the United Kingdom, although this particular standard's artistic representations of the banners of England, Ireland and Scotland in their respective quadrants was marginally different from the versions used today.

Scotland

In Scotland a separate version of the Royal Standard of the United Kingdom is used, whereby the red Lion Rampant of the Kingdom of Scotland appears in the first and fourth quadrants, displacing the three gold lions passant guardant of England, which occur only in the second quadrant. The third quadrant, displaying the gold harp of Ireland, remains unaltered from that version used throughout the remainder of the United Kingdom and overseas.

The Scottish version of the Royal Standard was used to cover the coffin of Queen Elizabeth II during the procession on the Royal Mile from the Palace of Holyroodhouse to St. Giles' Cathedral on 12 September 2022.

Other members of the Royal Family also use this Scottish version when in Scotland, with the only exceptions to this protocol being the consort of a queen regnant and the heir apparent, the Duke of Rothesay, each of whom has his own individual standard.

The Royal Standard of the United Kingdom used in Scotland differs from the current, traditional Royal Standard of Scotland in that the latter portrays the Lion Rampant in its entirety. As the banner of the Royal Coat of Arms of Scotland, the Royal Standard of Scotland remains a personal banner of the monarch  and, despite being commonly used as an unofficial second flag of Scotland, its use is restricted under an act passed in 1672 by the Parliament of Scotland.

The historic Royal Standard of Scotland is used officially at Scottish royal residences, when the monarch is not in residence, and by representatives of the Crown, including the First Minister, Lord Lieutenants in their lieutenancies, the Lord High Commissioner to the General Assembly of the Church of Scotland, and Lord Lyon King of Arms. A variation of the Royal Standard of Scotland is used by the heir apparent to the King of Scots, the Duke of Rothesay, whose personal Royal Standard is the Royal Standard of Scotland defaced with an azure-coloured label of three points. (The banner of the Duke of Rothesay also features the same, displayed upon an inner shield).

Heir to the Throne
The direct heir to the Throne has several distinct standards and banners for use throughout the United Kingdom in representation of this position. William, Prince of Wales has five standards at use for his various roles and titles.

Historic

Other members of the Royal Family
Other members of the Royal Family have personal standards of their own. These are variants of the Royal Standard of the United Kingdom (including that which is used in Scotland), defaced with a white label and either three points or pendants (for children of a sovereign), or five points (grandchildren of a sovereign). Traditionally all princes and princesses of royal blood (i.e. descendants of the sovereign) are granted arms on their 18th birthday, thus giving them a banner to fly from their residences.

The following members of the Royal Family have personal standards, listed according to the line of succession:

Consorts of the British monarch
Queens consort of the British monarch are granted arms based on the Royal Standard and their own personal arms from before their marriage, or the arms of their family. In Scotland, a queen consort will use the Scottish version of the Royal Standard. They do not have different standards for the Commonwealth realms that have their own Royal Standards.

Consorts of a queen regnant are not granted use of the British Royal Standard. They use standards based on their own family arms. However, Prince Albert of Saxe-Coburg-Gotha used a  standard of the royal arms (with a label for difference) quartered with his own family arms.

Recent historical royal standards

Royal standards 1198–1837

Others

Other members of the Royal Family may use the Royal Standard of the United Kingdom, but within an ermine border (a white border with black "tails" representing the ermine fur). This standard is mainly used for the wives of British princes, or members of the Royal Family who have not yet been granted their own arms. Diana, Princess of Wales, and more recently, Princess Alice, Duchess of Gloucester, had this standard draped over their coffins at their funerals.

Camilla, Duchess of Cornwall, also enjoyed the right to use this version of the Royal Standard although she rarely exercised it on her own.  She received a grant of arms on 17 July 2005, which, based on past practice, could form the basis for her own standard.Since her husband ascended to the throne she has used a different version, pictured above.

Uses of Standards

The Royal Standard is reserved only for the monarch, and is the most used. Most famously it signals the presence of the monarch at a royal residence, and is also used on official vehicles, primarily the Bentley State Limousine, but also on other road vehicles at home or abroad, often a Range Rover. The Royal Standard is also flown from aircraft and water vessels, including HMY Britannia and MV Spirit of Chartwell during the Thames Diamond Jubilee Pageant. When the monarch is aboard a British naval ship, the flag is flown from the main mast of the ship and is lowered upon his/her departure. The flag is also draped over the coffin of the Monarch upon his/her death.

In some situations, personal standards are displayed within the UK, such as within St Giles' Cathedral, Edinburgh (site of the Chapel of the Order of the Thistle), and St George's Chapel, Windsor Castle home of Banners of Knights of the Order of the Garter, at the Thames Diamond Jubilee Pageant Prince Andrew's standard flew from MV Havengore. However, the use of personal standards of other members of the Royal Family varies in frequency. Prior to his accession, the then-Prince of Wales flew his standard at Clarence House in the same way the Royal Standard is used over Buckingham Palace, but other members of the family tend not to fly theirs from their respective residences (though this may be due to the fact that many share official London Residences, as is the case at Kensington Palace).

Family members also do not use their standards on road vehicles, either privately or during official engagements (when more discreet cars are used, such as Jaguar) or state occasions (when the Liveried cars of the Royal Mews are used), this seems reserved for the Queen only, although when Prince Philip traveled alone at state occasions, his standard flew from the roof of his car, as seen with the funerals of Diana, Princess of Wales (when the Queen Mother also flew her personal standard from her car) and that of the Queen Mother, also, when a visiting Head of State on a state visit uses a car from the Royal Mews, his/her own flag is displayed. That said, when abroad, the standards of members of the family may well be flown: examples include Prince Charles, the Duchess of Cornwall and Prince William.

Personal Standards have been used to cover the coffins of the Queen Mother, the Duke of Edinburgh, Princess Margaret and the Duke of Windsor.

Position of Honour 
According to the Flag Institute, the order of precedence of flags in the United Kingdom is: the Royal Standards, the Union Flag, the flag of the host country (England, Scotland and Wales etc.), the flags of other nations (in alphabetical order), the Commonwealth Flag, the Flag of Europe, the county flags, the flags of cities or towns, the banners of arms, and the house flags.

See also

 Banners of the members of Knights of the Garter
 Flags of the English Interregnum
 Flags of Elizabeth II
 Royal standards of Canada
 Royal Standards

References

Further reading

External links 
 UK Flag Protocol

Elizabeth II flags
Charles III flags
 
British monarchy
United Kingdom
Flags displaying animals